Porong is a district in Sidoarjo Regency, East Java, Indonesia. It has a population of 68,243 (2018).

Villages
Porong consists of 19 villages namely:
Candipari
Gedang
Glagahharum
Jatirejo
Juwetkenongo
Kebakalan
Kebonagung
Kedungboto
Kedungsolo
Kesambi
Lajuk
Mindi
Pamotan
Pesawahan
Plumbon
Porong
Renokenongo
Siring
Wunut

References

External links
 

Sidoarjo Regency
districts of East Java